Centennial Bridge is a steel through arch crossing the Miramichi River in Northumberland County, New Brunswick, Canada. The bridge is 1.1 km long, and 240 feet high.  It carries Route 11, Route 8, and Route 134 over the river, connecting Douglastown on the north bank with Chatham on the south bank; both communities were merged with others in the vicinity through municipal amalgamation into the city of Miramichi.

The bridge was opened in 1967, Canada's centennial year. It replaced a ferry service (Romeo & Juliet) which operated between downtown Chatham and Ferry Road. Upon the bridge's opening, Romeo & Juliet was moved to service a new route across Kennebecasis Bay between Summerville and Millidgeville near Saint John.

Bridges of similar construction in eastern Canada include the Seal Island Bridge, the Burton Bridge, and the Laviolette Bridge over the St. Lawrence River in Trois-Rivières.

See also 
 List of bridges in Canada

References

Road bridges in New Brunswick
Buildings and structures in Miramichi, New Brunswick
Transport in Miramichi, New Brunswick
Bridges completed in 1967
Through arch bridges in Canada